Google Cloud Shell is an online bash shell based on Debian. The free tier (included with all Gmail accounts) includes 1.7 gigabytes of random-access memory and a persistent 5 gigabyte home directory. Except for the home and root directories, the Cloud Shell environment is volatile .

The editor in Google Cloud Shell is based on Eclipse Theia.

References 

Debian-based distributions
Cloud Shell